Brentford and Chiswick may refer to:

 Municipal Borough of Brentford and Chiswick 
 Brentford and Chiswick (UK Parliament constituency)